Siebenkäs (Sevencheese) is a German Romantic novel by Jean Paul, published in Berlin in three volumes between 1796 and 1797.

The novel's full title is Blumen-, Frucht- und Dornenstücke oder Ehestand, Tod und Hochzeit des Armenadvokaten F. St. Siebenkäs im Reichsmarktflecken Kuhschnappel — "Flower, Fruit, and Thorn Pieces; or, the Married Life, Death, and Wedding of the Public Defender F. St. Siebenkäs in Reichsmarktflecken, ." However, the book is most commonly known simply as Siebenkäs.

Plot
As the title suggests, the story concerns the life of Firmian Stanislaus Siebenkäs and is told in a comedic style. Unhappily married, Siebenkäs goes to consult his friend, Leibgeber (Bodygiver), who, in reality, is his alter ego, or Doppelgänger. Leibgeber convinces Siebenkäs to fake his own death, in order to begin a new life. Siebenkäs takes the advice of his alter ego, and soon meets the beautiful Natalie. The two fall in love; hence, the "wedding after death" noted in the title.

Trivia
Siebenkäs is the first novel in which a lookalike is described as a "Doppelgänger." It is a word of Jean Paul's own invention (originally spelled as "Doppeltgänger").

The sudden meeting of satire (in Jean Paul's description of life in a little town) and touching moments (in his poignant drawing of Siebenkäs' psychological pains), moves the reader to want to know about philosophical honesty as well as comfort of soul. The inconsistency and being torn apart of Siebenkäs is programatic, and still today a sign of sensitivities of bourgeois individuals.

References

External links
 Siebenkäs at Projekt Gutenberg-DE (in German)
 Siebenkäs at Google Books (English translation of Volume 2)
 Siebenkäs at the Internet Archive

1796 novels
1797 novels
1790s fantasy novels
18th-century German novels
Novels by Jean Paul